The 2019 Mississippi College Choctaws football team will represent Mississippi College during the 2019 NCAA Division II football season. They will led by sixth-year head coach John Bland. The Choctaws play their home games at Robinson-Hale Stadium and are members of the Gulf South Conference (GSC).

Preseason

Gulf South Conference coaches poll
On August 1, 2019, the Gulf South Conference released their preseason coaches poll with the Choctaws predicted to finish in 8th place in the conference.

Preseason All-Gulf South Conference Team
The Choctaws had two players at two positions selected to the preseason all-Gulf South Conference team.

Offense

Detric Hawthorn – AP

Defense

Turner Rotenberry – DB

Special teams

No players were selected

Schedule
Mississippi College 2019 football schedule consists of five home and five away games in the regular season. The Choctaws will host GSC foes Delta State, Florida Tech, North Greenville, and Shorter, and will travel to Valdosta State, West Alabama, West Florida, West Georgia.

The Choctaws will host one of the two non-conference games against Albany State from the Southern Intercollegiate Athletic Conference , and will travel to Alcorn State, from the Southwestern Athletic Conference.

Two of the ten games will be broadcast on ESPN3 and ESPN+, as part of the Gulf South Conference Game of the Week.

Schedule Source:

Rankings

References

Mississippi College
Mississippi College Choctaws football seasons
Mississippi College Choctaws football